Black note may refer to:

Black-colored keys on a keyboard
Black Note, an American jazz ensemble
note nere, a style of madrigal composition in medieval music